Zeta Volantis, Latinized from ζ Volantis, is a binary star system in the southern constellation of Volans. It has an apparent visual magnitude of 3.93, which is bright enough to be seen with the naked eye. Based upon their motion through space, this system made its perihelion passage some 858,000 years ago when it came within  of the Sun. It is currently moving away with a radial velocity of 48 km/s.

The primary component is K-type giant star with a stellar classification of K0 III. It has a derived luminosity of around 53 times that of the Sun, 1.74 times the Sun's mass and is about 5.27 billion years old. The measured angular diameter of this star is  mas. At the estimated distance of Zeta Volantis, this yields a physical size of about 11 times the radius of the Sun.

References

K-type giants
Binary stars
Volans (constellation)
Volantis, Zeta
Durchmusterung objects
063295
037504
3024